= 2010 Chinggis Khan Judo World Cup =

Judo competition

2010 Chinggis Khan World Cup
- Location: Ulaanbaatar, Mongolia
- Dates: 24–25 July 2010
- Competitors: 156 from 19 nations

The 2010 Chinggis Khan Judo World Cup was held in 24 and 25 July 2010 in Ulaanbaatar, Mongolia.

== Medalists ==
=== Men ===
Event	Gold	Silver	Bronze
−60 kg	Tumurkhuleg Davaadorj		
−66 kg	Tsagaanbaatar Hashbaatar		
−73 kg	Purevdorj Ganbold		
−81 kg	Jae-Bum Kim		
−90 kg	Young-Woo Kwon		
−100 kg	Tuvshinbayar Naidan		
+100 kg	Grzegorz Eitel		

=== Women ===
Event	Gold	Silver	Bronze
−48 kg	Haruna Asami		
−52 kg	Yuka Nishida		
−57 kg	Jan-Di Kim		
−63 kg	Munkhzaya Tsedevsuren		
−70 kg	Ye-Sul Hwang		
−78 kg	Catherine Jacques		
+78 kg	Jung-Eun Lee		
